German submarine U-860 was a long-range Type IXD2 U-boat built for Nazi Germany's Kriegsmarine during World War II.

She was ordered on 5 June 1941, and was laid down on 15 June 1942 at DeSchiMAG AG Weser, Bremen, as yard number 1066. She was launched on 23 March 1943 and commissioned under the command of Korvettenkapitän Paul Büchel on 12 August 1943.

Design
German Type IXD2 submarines were considerably larger than the original Type IXs. U-860 had a displacement of  when at the surface and  while submerged. She had two shafts and two  propellers.

U-860 was fitted with six  torpedo tubes (four fitted at the bow and two at the stern), 24 torpedoes, one  SK C/32 naval gun, 150 rounds, and a  Flak M42 with 2575 rounds as well as two  C/30 anti-aircraft guns with 8100 rounds. The boat had a complement of fifty-five.

Service history
On 21 April 1944, only ten days into her first, and only, war patrol, U-860 was able to escape an incoming airplane by diving in an emergency crash dive, however, two of her crew were lost when they were unable to make it back inside the boat in time.

This time it was an Avenger from the US Navy escort carrier  of VC-9 piloted by LTJG W.F. Chamberlain. The Avenger was able to make four attack runs on U-860 before being shot down and crashing into the sea on the last, but not before sending a contract report back to Solomons.

At 19:22 hrs U-860 was again located by an Avenger from Solomons. Waiting for reinforcements, aircraft from Solomons began three coordinated attacks starting at 19:46 hrs. In the first attack U-860 was strafed by rockets from two Avengers, piloted by Lt. Cdr. H.M. Avery and Ens. M.J. Spear and two Wildcats piloted by Ens. T.J. Wadsworth and Ens. R.E. McMahon. U-860 was able to force Wadsworth, in his Wildcat, to return to Solomons after damaging his drop tank. McMahon and an Avenger, this one piloted by LTJG D.E. Weigle, followed up the first attack with another rocket attack. U-860 was struck by rockets in both of these attacks. In the last attack an Avenger piloted by LTJG W.F. Chamberlain dropped two depth charges directly forward of the conning tower while Lt. Cdr. Avery strafed U-860. Despite this, U-860 was able to hit Chamberlain's Avenger, which was also caught in the explosions of the depth charges, forcing him to ditch ahead of the boat. U-860 sank after this last attack with 30-40 of her crew making it off.  and  arrived during the night and were able to rescue 20 crewmen, including her commander, FKpt. Paul Büchel, however, no trace of Chamberlain or his crew were found.

References

Bibliography

External links

World War II submarines of Germany
German Type IX submarines
Ships built in Bremen (state)
1943 ships
U-boats commissioned in 1943
U-boats sunk in 1944
World War II shipwrecks in the Atlantic Ocean
Maritime incidents in June 1944